Planernaya:

 Planernaya (Moscow Metro)
 Planernaya District
 Planernaya (street)
 Planernaya (railroad station)
 Planernaya (sport base)